Hotel Eutaw, also known as the East Russell Street Inn, is a historic hotel located at Orangeburg, Orangeburg County, South Carolina. It was designed by architect G. Lloyd Preacher and built in 1926–1927. It is a seven-story, steel-frame with brick veneer, skyscraper with an "L"-shaped plan. The front façade features a projecting one-story, six bay, cast stone entrance block.

It was added to the National Register of Historic Places in 1985.

References

Hotel buildings on the National Register of Historic Places in South Carolina
Hotel buildings completed in 1927
Buildings and structures in Orangeburg County, South Carolina
National Register of Historic Places in Orangeburg County, South Carolina